È Stato la mafia (translated from the Italian language in Mafia is State) is a journalistic essay written by Marco Travaglio in 2014. The essay focuses on the State-Mafia Pact, from its causes to its consequences and its protagonists. The publication of the book was preceded by the namesake recital.

Title
The Italian title is a pun untranslatable in English between the word Stato (in english State) and the meaning of the words è stato (in english it was). So the sense of the title is "It was the mafia" and "Mafia is State", as it was translated.

See also
State-Mafia Pact
The State-Mafia Pact

References

2014 works